The 1955–1956 season was the 65th season in Liverpool F.C.'s existence, and was their second consecutive year in the Second Division. The club finished just outside the top two at third place, four points outside the automatic promotion places. They were also knocked out of the FA Cup by the eventual holders Manchester City in the Fifth Round.

Squad

Goalkeepers
 Doug Rudham
 Dave Underwood

Defenders
 Don Campbell
 Laurie Hughes
 Ray Lambert
 John Molyneux
 Ronnie Moran
 Tom McNulty
 Fred Perry
 John Price
 Alex South
 Geoff Twentyman
 Dick White

Midfielders
 Alan A'Court
 Brian Jackson
 Jimmy Payne
 Roy Saunders
 Barry Wilkinson

Forwards
 Eric Anderson
 Alan Arnell
 Louis Bimpson
 Joe Dickson
 John Evans
 Billy Liddell
 Jimmy Melia
 Tony Rowley

Table

Results

Second Division

FA Cup

References
 LFC History.net – 1955-56 season
 Liverweb - 1955-56 Season

Liverpool F.C. seasons
Liverpool